Eric Gillies (born August 19, 1952) is a former Canadian ice dancer. With partner Susan Carscallen, he competed at the 1976 Winter Olympics and won the gold medal at the 1977 Canadian Figure Skating Championships.

Gillies was born in Moncton, New Brunswick. He has 3 children, Jean-Simon Désy-Gillies, Ferris Désy-Gillies and Lurick-Alexandre Désy-Gillies. As well as has 2 step-daughters, Coralee Allaert and Rochelle Allaert.

Results
With Susan Carscallen:

References

1952 births
Canadian male ice dancers
Figure skaters at the 1976 Winter Olympics
Living people
Olympic figure skaters of Canada
Sportspeople from Moncton
20th-century Canadian people
21st-century Canadian people